James "Jim" Leo Norris (July 7, 1930 – June 3, 2021) was an American water polo player who competed in the 1952 Summer Olympics. He was born in Salt Lake City, Utah. Norris was a member of the American water polo team which finished fourth in the 1952 tournament. He played eight matches.

References

External links
profile

1930 births
2021 deaths
American male water polo players
Olympic water polo players of the United States
Water polo players at the 1952 Summer Olympics
Sportspeople from Salt Lake City